Acochlidium amboinense is a species of freshwater gastropod, an aquatic gastropod mollusc within the family Acochlidiidae.

References

Acochlidiidae
Gastropods described in 1892